Milan Janković (born 31 December 1959) is a Serbian retired footballer who played as a midfielder.

Club career
Born in Belgrade, Socialist Republic of Serbia, Socialist Federal Republic of Yugoslavia, Janković played youth football with Red Star Belgrade, signing in 1978 with NK Maribor alongside Vladislav Bogićević and Rade Radić in exchange for the best Slovenian player at the time, Milan Arnejčič. Two years later, however, he returned to his previous club, going on to be an important member as the capital side won two leagues and as many cups; he also missed the entire 1982–83 season due to injury.

In late January 1987, aged 27, Janković was allowed to leave his country, joining La Liga powerhouse Real Madrid and being a starter in most of his first full campaign, teaming up in midfield with Rafael Gordillo, Míchel and Rafael Martín Vázquez in support of strikers Emilio Butragueño and Hugo Sánchez, as the Merengues won the league with 95 goals scored.

Janković closed out his career in 1990 at the age of 30, after two seasons with R.S.C. Anderlecht in Belgium.

International career
Janković won 12 caps for Yugoslavia in three years, but did not attend any major international tournament. He scored on his debut, a 2–4 friendly loss with Brazil on 30 April 1986.

In the 2000s, Janković coached the Tonga national team.

Post-retirement
In 1991, the year after ending his playing career, Janković emigrated to Australia, settling in North Queensland with his Cairns-born wife.

See also
List of NK Maribor players

Honours

Club

Red Star Belgrado 

 Yugoslav First League: 1980–81, 1983–84
 Yugoslav Cup: 1981–82, 1984–85

Real Madrid

 La Liga: 1986–87, 1987–88

Anderlecht

 Belgian Cup: 1988–89
 European Cup Winners' Cup: 1989–90 (runners-up)
 Bruges Matins: 1988

References

External links

National team data 

 Milan Janković Interview

1959 births
Living people
Footballers from Belgrade
Yugoslav footballers
Serbian footballers
Association football midfielders
Yugoslav First League players
NK Maribor players
Red Star Belgrade footballers
La Liga players
Real Madrid CF players
Belgian Pro League players
R.S.C. Anderlecht players
Yugoslavia international footballers
Serbian expatriate footballers
Expatriate footballers in Spain
Expatriate footballers in Belgium
Serbian expatriate sportspeople in Spain
Serbian expatriate sportspeople in Belgium
Serbian football managers
Serbian expatriate football managers
Tonga national football team managers
Expatriate football managers in Tonga
Serbian expatriate sportspeople in Tonga
Serbian emigrants to Australia